Zemiropsis is a genus of sea snails, marine gastropod mollusks in the family Babyloniidae.

Species
Species within the genus Zemiropsis include:
 Zemiropsis demertziae Fraussen & Rosado, 2013
 Zemiropsis papillaris (G.B. Sowerby I, 1825)
 Zemiropsis pintado (Kilburn, 1971)
 Zemiropsis pulchrelineata (Kilburn, 1973)
 Zemiropsis rosadoi (Bozzetti, 1998)
Species brought into synonymy
 Zemiropsis joostei Dekker, 2008: synonym of Zemiropsis papillaris (G.B. Sowerby I, 1825)

References

 Gittenberger E. & Uit de Weerd D.R. (2005). "Babylonia and Zemiropsis (Gastropoda: Caenogastropoda: Babyloniidae), anatomy, shell morphology, distribution and DNA". Journal of Conchology 38(6): 649-652

External links